Flat Top is an unincorporated community in Mercer County, West Virginia, United States.

The Flat Top Post Office began operation on March 5, 1852. 

Flat Top is home of Mavis Manor a Queen Anne style, Victorian manor house and one of southern West Virginia first Farmstay.

The community takes its name from the level highlands upon which it is situated—the "flat top," which follows the crest of "Great Flat Top Mountain" for nearly 30 miles, from the New River Gorge, in the northeast, to the Virginia border in the southwest. The Lilly Monument, erected to honor the memories of settlers Robert and Fannie Lilly, overlooks the community from a knoll to its northeast.

References

Unincorporated communities in Mercer County, West Virginia
Unincorporated communities in West Virginia
Coal towns in West Virginia

37° 35' 22" N / 81° 6' 24" W